Anne O'Shiell (20 November 1720, Nantes – 30 June 1793, Nantes) was a French businesswoman.  She managed the major slave trade firm Grou et Michel in Nantes from 1774 to 1793, which at that time was one of the most successful companies of its kind, making her a millionaire.

Life
Anne O'Shiell was the daughter of the Irish Jacobite exile and successful slave trade merchant Luc O'Shiell (1677–1745) and Agnès Vanasse, and the sister of Mary O'Shiell and Agnès O'Shiell. Her family and their manor Manoir de la Placelière were the center of the Irish of Nantes, and the manor was known as a gathering place for Jacobites. In 1741 she married the millionaire slave trader Guillaume Grou (16981774). When her father died in 1745, she and her sisters Agnes and Mary inherited the Manoir de la Placelière, which was bought by Anne and her spouse in 1747. In 1755, her birth family was recognized as nobility by the French crown. Anne had no children, and when she was widowed in 1774, she inherited a vast fortune and one of the biggest companies in Nantes, at that time a major port in the international slave trade. During the French Revolution, the slave trade was abolished. 

She died in June 1793, during the Battle of Nantes. In November 1793, her fortune was confiscated by the revolutionary government.

References

1720 births
1793 deaths
18th-century French businesspeople
French slave traders
Women slave owners
18th-century French businesswomen